Interstate 70 (I-70) is a mainline route of the Interstate Highway System in the United States connecting Cove Fort, Utah, to Baltimore, Maryland. I-70 in Kansas contains the first segment in the country to start being paved and to be completed in the Interstate Highway System. The route passes through several of the state's principal cities in the process, including Kansas City, Topeka, and Salina. The route also passes through the cities of Lawrence, Junction City, and Abilene.

The section of I-70 from Topeka to the Missouri border is co-designated as the Kansas Turnpike; only the section between Topeka and just west of Kansas City is tolled.

Route description

I-70 runs concurrently with U.S. Highway 24 (US 24) from the Colorado state line until US 24 splits at Levant and runs north of I-70. At Colby, I-70 begins to turn southeast until it reaches Oakley, where US 40 joins with I-70 for a concurrent journey through most of the state. Initially, the route remains high and unusually level as it follows a projection of the High Plains into the state. From exit 140 (Riga Road), the route lowers from the High Plains into the Blue Hills region, as indicated by gentle undulations in the road and the unusual appearance of stone posts in the countryside. Approaching Russell, the route passes over three active sinkholes, the largest being the Crawford Sinkhole at mile 179. Past Russell, the route follows a ridge between the Smoky Hill River and its tributary, the Saline River, where the highway passes through the Smoky Hills Wind Farm. Reaching the county line between Russell and Ellsworth counties, the road begins to traverse the Smoky Hills.

At Salina, I-135 begins its journey southward toward Wichita, and I-70 continues through Abilene and Junction City, where the road begins to run through the Flint Hills.

In Topeka, I-70 intersects a child route, I-470, twice. The second time it is intersected, the Kansas Turnpike merges, making I-70 into a toll road. I-70 and the turnpike are concurrent from Topeka to Bonner Springs, the turnpike's eastern terminus. From Bonner Springs to 18th Street and extending on to the Kansas eastern border, the highway is free.

I-70 enters Missouri via a main northern route on the Lewis and Clark Viaduct above the confluence of the Kansas River and Missouri River and a route designated "Alternate I-70" which has signs for I-70 as well as I-670 just south of Kansas City main downtown area.

From exit 275 at Abilene to the Missouri state line, the road is named the Dwight D. Eisenhower–Harry S. Truman Presidential Highway. It retains the designation until exit 16 in Missouri at Independence, the location of Truman's presidential library.

History
The section of I-70 that is now the Kansas Turnpike was finished by 1956 and opened to traffic. West of Topeka, the freeway was constructed from Topeka west to Salina at its junction with US 81, as well as from Ogallah to Grainfield. From Salina, the freeway was completed through Wilson the next year. On October 9, 1959, the section of I-70 opened from Junction City west to Abilene through a ribbon-cutting ceremony. A segment of I-70 from Levant through Ogallah was finished by 1965. Another section was built the following year connecting Wilson to Grainfield. The freeway was completed through Kansas with a last section near the Colorado border in 1970.

Exit list
Exit numbers correspond to the mileposts where they are located (numbered east from the Colorado border), except for those between Topeka and Kansas City, which are part of the Kansas Turnpike and use its mileposts (numbered nominally north from the Oklahoma border) instead.

Auxiliary routes
I-70 has two auxiliary routes in Kansas. I-470 is a loop around the southern side of Topeka that is signed as the Dr. Martin Luther King Jr. Memorial Highway and overlaps the Kansas Turnpike on the southeast side of town. I-670 is an alternate route for I-70 travelers through downtown Kansas City that is signed as the Dillingham Freeway and as Alternate I-70.

References

External links

 Kansas Highway Maps: Current, Historic, KDOT
  - video of the Smoky Hills Wind Farm around mile 230 on Interstate 70, near Ellsworth

70
 Kansas
Transportation in Sherman County, Kansas
Transportation in Thomas County, Kansas
Transportation in Logan County, Kansas
Transportation in Gove County, Kansas
Transportation in Trego County, Kansas
Transportation in Ellis County, Kansas
Transportation in Russell County, Kansas
Transportation in Ellsworth County, Kansas
Transportation in Lincoln County, Kansas
Transportation in Saline County, Kansas
Transportation in Dickinson County, Kansas
Transportation in Geary County, Kansas
Transportation in Riley County, Kansas
Transportation in Wabaunsee County, Kansas
Transportation in Shawnee County, Kansas
Transportation in Douglas County, Kansas
Transportation in Leavenworth County, Kansas
Transportation in Wyandotte County, Kansas